FlexWage (formerly FlexWage Solutions) is a Mountainside, New Jersey-based company that provides financial services including earned wage access. Its primary product is WageBank, which gives employees access to their earned wages prior to their next payday via a debit card. The WageBank product is considered an alternative to payday loans.

History 
FlexWage was founded by Frank Dombroski and John Lockhart in 2009. The company acquired Louisville, Kentucky-based financial technology company Sum180 in 2019.

References 

Financial services companies of the United States
Companies based in New Jersey
Financial services companies established in 2009
2009 establishments in the United States
Earned Wage Access
Financial software companies